The Military District of Pest-Ofen was one of the administrative units of the Habsburg Kingdom of Hungary from 1850 to 1860. The seat of the district was Ofen (Buda). It included central parts of present-day Hungary.

See also
Administrative divisions of the Kingdom of Hungary

External links
Map
Map

1850 establishments in Hungary
Military units and formations disestablished in 1860
19th century in Hungary
History of Budapest
Military history of Hungary